Patent pending is an expression used in patent law.

Patent pending may also refer to:
Patent Pending (album), the 2006 debut album of the American band Heavens
Patent Pending (band), an American pop-punk band
"Patent Pending" (short story), a short story by Arthur C. Clarke